Probolocoryphe glandulosa is a digenean parasite in the genus Probolocoryphe of family Microphallidae. Recorded hosts include the clapper rail (Rallus crepitans), ruddy turnstone (Arenaria interpres), raccoon (Procyon lotor), little blue heron (Ardea caerulea), Wilson's plover (Charadrius wilsonia), black-bellied plover (Pluvialis squatarola), and marsh rice rat (Oryzomys palustris).

References

Literature cited
Heard, R.W., III and Sikora, W.B. 1969.  Probolocoryphe Otagaki, 1958 (Trematoda: Microphallidae), a senior synonym of Mecynophallus Cable, Connor, and Balling, 1960, with notes on the genus (subscription required). The Journal of Parasitology 55(3):674–675.
Kinsella, J.M. 1988. Comparison of helminths of rice rats, Oryzomys palustris, from freshwater and saltwater marshes in Florida. Proceedings of the Helminthological Society of Washington 55(2):275–280.

Plagiorchiida
Animals described in 1955
Parasites of birds